Park Soo-hong (born October 27, 1970), is a South Korean comedian and presenter.

Career
In 1991, Park won bronze in the National College Comedy Contest, making his official debut in the South Korean entertainment industry. In the early 1990s, Park was a part of a group of comedians who called themselves Team Potato, composed of Kim Gook-jin, Kim Soo-yong and Kim Yong-man, who all debuted in the same year on KBS. It had been reported that Kim Yong-man had been admitted to hospital due to their busy schedule, and therefore Kim Gook-jin attempted to reason with television program producers to lighten their workload. However, this request was not received well by producers, who then decided it was necessary to permanently ban Team Potato from making appearances on television. As a result, in January 1993, the four comedians planned to leave South Korea for the United States of America, taking a break from the South Korean entertainment industry, although ultimately, only Kim Yong-man and Kim Gook-jin went to the United States of America, while Park began his compulsory army duty and Kim Soo-yong went to Canada.

In 2004, Park hosted the 2004 MBC Entertainment Awards, along with Kim Won-hee. In 2005, he hosted the 41st Baeksang Arts Awards, with announcer Lee Hye-seung. In 2017, Park hosted the 2017 KBS Drama Awards, along with Lee Yoo-ri and Namkoong Min. In 2018, he hosted the 2018 Miss Korea pageant, alongside Yura (Girl's Day).

Personal life
Park is a darts fan, having attended and participated in the Phoenix Summer Festival's dart competition, held and sponsored by the Korea Darts Association.

In 2018, ahead of the South Korean local elections and the South Korean by-elections, Park took part in the 613 Vote and Laugh  campaign, amongst other comedians such as Kang Ho-dong and Shin Dong-yup, encouraging the South Korean public to use their vote in the elections.

On July 28, 2021, Park wrote on his personal Instagram that he had registered his marriage with his non-celebrity girlfriend.On November 24, 2022, it was confirmed that the official wedding will take place on December 23, 2022.

In early September 2022, Park Soo Hong’s older brother was arrested on charges of embezzling an estimated 10 billion KRW (approximately $7.1 million USD) from Park Soo Hong. On October 4, 2022 while undergoing a cross-examination by the prosecution, his father attacked him multiple times, which included kicking him and delivering verbal threats. He was transferred to the emergency room of a nearby hospital after fainting due to severe stress and shock.

Filmography

Variety shows

Awards and nominations

References

1970 births
Living people
South Korean male comedians
South Korean television presenters
South Korean radio presenters
People from Seoul